The GK convoys were a series of Caribbean convoys which ran during the Battle of the Atlantic in World War II.

They take their name from the route: Guantanamo, Cuba to Key West, Florida

Overview 
The GK series was the reverse of KG series that ran from 1 September 1942 until 6 May 1945. There were 163 "GK" convoys, comprising 1,064 individual ship listings. The escort ships for these convoys are not listed in the reference cited. Almost all ships listed in a convoy made the complete trip between Guantanamo and Key West. Only two are listed as going to Port Everglades, Florida, and one to Mayport, Florida.

The series started with GK 700 through GK 878 with 16 convoys cancelled and no record available for the last convoy, GK 878. There are also no ships listed as being lost.

Convoy List

1942

1943

1944

1945

Notes 
Citations

Bibliography 

Books
 
 
 
Online resources

External links 
 Full listing of ships sailing in GK convoys

GK 01
Battle of the Atlantic
Caribbean Sea operations of World War II